The 1997 Green Bay Packers season was their 79th season overall and their 77th in the National Football League (NFL). The season concluded with the team winning its second consecutive NFC championship, but losing 31-24 to John Elway's Denver Broncos in Super Bowl XXXII. The heavily-favored team narrowly missed its opportunity to post back-to-back Super Bowl wins.

After a dominating 1996 campaign which ended with a victory in Super Bowl XXXI, many expected the Packers to repeat as champions in 1997. During training camp, star safety LeRoy Butler, among others, said that the Packers had the chance to run the table and go 19–0. This opinion drew increased coverage from the media as the Packers notched impressive victories in all five preseason games. The undefeated hype ended quickly, however, when Green Bay lost week 2 in Philadelphia.

Following a relatively slow 3–2 start, the Packers caught fire in the second half of the season, finishing with a 13–3 regular season record and 8–0 home record for the second consecutive year. In the playoffs, Green Bay defeated the Tampa Bay Buccaneers at Lambeau Field in the divisional round, and San Francisco 49ers at 3Com Park in the NFC Championship. Some in the media dubbed the NFC title game as "the real Super Bowl" because of the 49ers' and Packers' league dominance, and the relative inferiority of the AFC in recent Super Bowls. Green Bay's win marked the third consecutive year the team had defeated San Francisco in the playoffs.

The Packers entered Super Bowl XXXII as 11-point favorites. The point spread was likely determined by Green Bay's victory in the previous Super Bowl, the AFC's string of 13 consecutive Super Bowl losses, and Denver's losses in four previous Super Bowls. The game itself was a seesaw battle, and one of the most exciting Super Bowls in history. The Broncos won the thriller 31–24, earning John Elway his first Super Bowl victory at the age of 37, and the first championship in franchise history. Years later, Brett Favre said the Broncos were far underrated, and credited Denver's innovative blitz packages and strategies, foreign to the league at that time, for confusing the Packers.

Packers' quarterback Brett Favre was named the league's MVP for the third year in a row in 1997. Favre is the first and only player in the history of the award to win three MVPs consecutively. The Packers became the first team to have six NFL MVP award winners.

The 1997 Packers are one of only two teams in NFL history to win seven games against teams that would go on to make the playoffs.

Offseason

1997 NFL draft

Despite picking last in the 1997 NFL draft, the Packers did well, picking up future all-pro tackle Ross Verba and free safety Darren Sharper.

Ronnie McAda was Mr. Irrelevant.

Undrafted free agents

Staff

Roster

Schedule

Preseason

Regular season
The Packers finished the 1997 regular season with a 13–3 record, clinching first place in the NFC Central division, as well as a first-round playoff bye.

Note: Intra-division opponents are in bold text.

Game summaries

Week 1

Week 2

Week 7

Week 12
The Packers suffered a shocking loss to the 0–10 Indianapolis Colts, but did not lose another game until the Super Bowl.

Standings

Playoffs

NFC Divisional Game vs. Tampa Bay Buccaneers

NFC Championship Game at. San Francisco 49ers

Super Bowl XXXII vs. Denver Broncos

 The Packers advanced to their fourth Super Bowl appearance, which was also their second consecutive appearance. Despite being favored by double digits, they were denied their fourth ring, as well as their second consecutive championship, by John Elway and the Denver Broncos, who defeated them 31–24. To date, the loss is the only Packers' Super Bowl loss in team history.

Awards and records
 Brett Favre, NFC leader, completions (304)
 Brett Favre, NFC leader, passing yards (3,867)
 Brett Favre, NFC leader, touchdown passes (35)
 Brett Favre, NFL most valuable player
 Brett Favre, NFC Pro Bowl selection
 Brett Favre, All-Pro selection
 Brett Favre, Best NFL Player ESPY Award
Brett Favre, First Player to win Three Consecutive MVP Awards
 Robert Brooks, National Football League Comeback Player of the Year Award

References

1997
NFC Central championship seasons
National Football Conference championship seasons
Green Bay Packers
Green